Frederick Barry may refer to:

 Frederick L. Barry (1897–1960), bishop of Albany in the United States
 Frederick G. Barry (1845–1909), U.S. Representative from Mississippi
 Fred Barry (born 1948), former American football player

See also
 Fred Berry (disambiguation)